The Pajama Sam series is a collection of point and click children's adventure and puzzle games originally created by Humongous Entertainment. After the release of the first two adventure games, the series was proving a success when the products sold one million copies and won 40 awards of excellence.

Games

Adventure games 
All games consist of four parts: an introductory phase in which Sam begins in one room of his house, looking for his cape (although in the first game, it was a mask, a flashlight and a lunch box as his "Portable Bad Guy Containment Unit") and entering an imaginary world through some dark space in his house, the actual journey he undertakes in that world, and a concluding cinematic that ends the story. While Sam is in the imaginary world, he can move from one screen to another and interact with the environment with point-and-click controls. Each area features clickpoints that play animations irrelevant to the plot or feature crossover cameos of the three other Junior Adventure series, as well as important items and non-playable characters that can be collected or interacted with. Some items or areas are inaccessible due to an obstacle that is usually overcome by finding and using another item. The obstacles Sam faces and the methods by which he is to progress to the main goal are determined at random at the beginning of a playthrough, and playthroughs in progress can be saved and continued at a later time. In addition to the main storyline, each individual game features hidden collectible items scattered in the world that Sam does not have to reach, with a special reward available to those who can find them all.

In the first game, the player had no control over what scenarios would be encountered in one playthrough. In the sequel, the player can choose from several combinations of scenarios to play with, and in the last two games, the player is given complete control on what kind of scenarios are encountered for each step towards resolving the main conflict.

 Pajama Sam: No Need to Hide When It's Dark Outside (1996)
 Pajama Sam: Don't Fear The Dark (2008 Wii port)
 Pajama Sam: No Need to Hide (2012 mobile port)
 Pajama Sam 2: Thunder and Lightning Aren't so Frightening (1998)
 Pajama Sam: Thunder and Lightning (2014 mobile port)
 Pajama Sam 3: You Are What You Eat from Your Head to Your Feet (2000) 
 Pajama Sam 3 (2015 mobile port)
 Pajama Sam: Life Is Rough When You Lose Your Stuff! (2003)

The third title was ported to the original PlayStation. More than a decade since the series' inception, the first game in the series was also ported to the Wii, which suffered from limited availability due to a legal conflict concerning its development. In the 2010s, the first three games of the series were ported to iOS and Android as paid games.

Other games

Main characters 
 Pajama Sam (voiced by Pamela Segall Adlon from 1996 to 2001, E.G. Daily in "Pajama Sam's Sock Works" and Elisha Ferguson in "Life Is Rough When You Lose Your Stuff") - A six-year-old boy who always wears blue pajamas and dons a red cape when he transforms into his superhero alter ego to solve a problem. He is also very fond of cheese and has an older brother named Mark.
 Pajama Man - Sam's superhero idol who has a comic book series and his own animated TV show.

Availability 
For Steam the games were released as single games, or bundled with the other Pajama Sam games in "Pajama Sam Complete Pack" or was packaged with all Humongous Entertainment games in "Humongous Entertainment Complete Pack".
 The games are available DRM-free from GOG.com as Pajama Sam volumes 1 and 2, using SCUMMVM and running on Microsoft Windows, OS X and Linux.
 Infogrames released a CD titled "Freddi Fish / Pajama Sam Value 2-Pack" containing Freddi Fish and the Case of the Missing Kelp Seeds and Pajama Sam: No Need to Hide When It's Dark Outside.
 Humongous Entertainment released a CD titled "Humongous Entertainment Triple Treat", which included Freddi Fish and the Case of the Missing Kelp Seeds, Pajama Sam's Sock Works and Putt-Putt Saves the Zoo.
 Humongous Entertainment released a CD titled "Humongous Entertainment Triple Treat 2", which included Pajama Sam: No Need to Hide When It's Dark Outside, Freddi Fish and Luther's Maze Madness and Putt Putt Travels Through Time.
 Pajama Sam: No Need to Hide When It's Dark Outside was included in the "Kids' BackPack IV" CD along with Math Blaster Episode I: In Search of Spot, Freddi Fish and the Case of the Missing Kelp Seeds, Just Me and My Mom and Muppet Treasure Island.
 Big Island Publishing released in 2009, a twin pack titled "Pajama Sam: 2 Pack" and containing both Pajama Sam 3: You Are What You Eat from Your Head to Your Feet and Pajama Sam: Life Is Rough When You Lose Your Stuff!.
 Humongous Entertainment released a bundle of 3 discs titled "Pajama Sam 3-pack", which included Pajama Sam: No Need to Hide When It's Dark Outside, Pajama Sam's Lost & Found and Pajama Sam 3: You Are What You Eat from Your Head to Your Feet.
 Pajama Sam's Sock Works was released for Windows and Macintosh on a compilation CD titled "Super Duper Arcade 1", along with Spy Fox in: Cheese Chase, Freddi Fish and Luther's Water Worries and Putt-Putt and Pep's Balloon-O-Rama.
 Pajama Sam's Lost & Found was released for Windows and Macintosh on a compilation CD titled "Super Duper Arcade 2", along with Spy Fox in: Hold the Mustard, Freddi Fish and Luther's Maze Madness and Putt-Putt and Pep's Dog on a Stick

Books 
Various children's books about Pajama Sam have been published by Lyrick Publishing.

References

External links 
 Pajama Sam at Humongous Entertainment
 

Humongous Entertainment games
Children's educational video games
Video game franchises
Adventure games
Superhero video games
Video game franchises introduced in 1996
Video games developed in the United States
Video game superheroes